Edwin Frederick "Ed" Gorman (September 25, 1892 – March 10, 1963) was a Canadian professional ice hockey player. He played in the National Hockey League (NHL) for the Ottawa Senators and the Toronto Maple Leafs between 1924 and 1928. The rest of his career, which lasted from 1913 to 1928, was spent in minor leagues. He was a member of the 1927 Stanley Cup-winning Ottawa Senators.

Playing career
Ed Gorman had a long amateur career in competitive hockey before joining the Ottawa Senators of the NHL for the 1924–25 season. Born in Buckingham, Quebec near Ottawa, he played for the Buckingham senior team from 1913 to 1915 before moving south to play for the Pittsburgh Duquesne Garden and Pittsburgh Athletic Association teams. He returned to the Ottawa area in 1917, playing for Pembroke Munitions. He then played competitive amateur hockey in the Ottawa City Hockey League from 1918 until 1924, including the Ottawa Montagnards in their try for the 1924 Allan Cup. He was signed to the Ottawa Senators in 1924, and he would play three seasons for the Senators, including their Stanley Cup championship of 1927. After the Cup win, he was traded to the Toronto Maple Leafs for cash, part of a sell-off by the financially strapped Senators. He played 19 games for Toronto before the Maple Leafs demoted him. He refused the demotion and was traded to Kitchener, Ontario of the Can-Am league. He reported, and played 12 games for Kitchener before retiring from competitive hockey.

Family
His great-great nephew, Ryan Kuffner, also played hockey.

Career statistics

Regular season and playoffs

Transactions
 November 6, 1924 - Signed as a free agent by Ottawa (NHL)
 October 26, 1927 - Traded from Ottawa (NHL) to Toronto (NHL) for cash.
 February 13, 1928 - Traded from Toronto (NHL) to Kitchener (Can-Am) for cash.

References

External links
 

1892 births
1963 deaths
Canadian ice hockey defencemen
Ice hockey people from Gatineau
Kitchener Millionaires players
Ottawa Senators (1917) players
Pittsburgh Athletic Association ice hockey players
Stanley Cup champions
Toronto Maple Leafs players